Pernille Sørensen may refer to:
 Pernille Sørensen (figure skater)
 Pernille Sørensen (actress)